And the Glass Handed Kites is the fourth studio album by Danish band Mew, released in the United Kingdom on 19 September 2005, and in the United States on 25 July 2006.

Overview
And the Glass Handed Kites was composed as a single continuous suite. Critics have likened the album to one long song due to the tracks' unnoticed transitions.

And the Glass Handed Kites sound has been compared to Sigur Rós, Dinosaur Jr., Ride, and progressive rock.

And the Glass Handed Kites peaked at number 2 on Denmark's Tracklisten. Four singles were released for the album: "Apocalypso", "Special", "Why Are You Looking Grave?" and "The Zookeeper's Boy". Despite originally not having been released as a single, the track "The Zookeeper's Boy" gained massive popularity with the biggest radio station in Denmark, P3, reaching number 1 on the radio's Tjeklisten charts from 9 October 2005 through 6 November 2005.P3 – Tjelisten 6/11 2005. P3. Retrieved 3 August 2011. The track was voted "Hit of the Year" by Gaffa readers, with another Mew song ("Special") coming in second. "The Zookeeper's Boy" was later released as a single in 2006.

The Japanese bonus track, "Shiroi Kuchibiruno Izanai" is an alternate version of "White Lips Kissed" with the lyrics and title translated into Japanese.

Reception

And the Glass Handed Kites has been well received by critics. James Christopher Monger of AllMusic gave the album a positive review, writing "Fans of OK Computer-era Radiohead, My Bloody Valentine, and Disintegration-era Cure will find And the Glass Handed Kites one of the most breathtaking things to come along since the dawn of the dream pop/post-punk genres themselves." Drowned in Sound'''s Jordan Dowling also gave And the Glass Handed Kites a positive review, writing "If you are looking for an album that you can put on for a couple minutes to fill time then you'd do better to look elsewhere, but if you want to be transported to an ethereal demi-world stuck between real life and dreams then ensure you purchase this. A masterpiece of overstated proportions, which is the greatest concept of all." Pitchfork reviewer Nitsuh Abebe praised the album's epic feel and called the album "a terrific accomplishment". The same website also criticized the album cover, naming it one of the worst album covers of 2006.

In a more mixed review, Conrad Amenta of Cokemachineglow.com wrote "The real shame is that on this album... the songs become secondary to the gesture. They are denied a sense of finality or, in And the Glass Handed Kites case, are sometimes deprived of an ending altogether." Amenta concluded: "The band does have the musical ability, their songs are reasonably well constructed, and the melodies are there. It’s only the ridiculous costume of importance they wear so self-consciously that’ll keep them from ever joining the party."

The album has won several music prizes in Denmark, including four Danish Music Awards. Gaffa named And the Glass Handed Kites the best Danish album of 2005. The album also helped Mew win awards outside of Denmark, with the band winning the 2005 MTV Europe Music Award for Best Danish Act. Pitchfork Media ranked the song "The Zookeeper's Boy" #92 on its list of the top 100 tracks of 2006.

Track listing

Personnel
The following people contributed to And the Glass Handed Kites'':

Mew
Jonas Bjerre – electric guitar, piano, harmonium, synthesizers, vocals
Bo Madsen – electric guitar
Johan Wohlert – bass, guitar
Silas Utke Graae Jørgensen – drums, percussion

Additional personnel
Lasse Mauritzen – french horn on tracks 2, 3, 14
J Mascis – additional vocals on track 3, additional background vocals on track 10
Bo Rande – flugelhorn (tracks 2, 3), trumpet (tracks 13, 14)
Rebecca Stark – soprano vocals on tracks 2, 8
Damon Tutunjian – additional guitar on track 5
Boys' choir on track 13
Mathias Aagaard Christensen
Frederik Peter Jakobsen
Niklas Emil De Fries
Frederik Stadager Larsen
Gaël Amzalag – photography
Kevin Bacon – mixing
Michael Beinhorn – engineer, producer
Jonnie Blackburn – A&R
Frank Filipetti – engineer
Pete Jackson – management
George Marino – mastering
Alan McGee – management
M/M Paris – art direction and design
Mads Nørgård – engineer
Jonathan Quarmby – mixing
Felipe Tichauer – engineer

Charts

Album

Singles

References

External links
And the Glass Handed Kites page on the official Mew website

Mew (band) albums
2005 albums
Albums produced by Michael Beinhorn
Albums produced by Joshua (record producer)